Bayo Aziz Fahad is a Ugandan professional footballer currently playing for MFK Vyškov in the Czech National Football League. Bayo has played internationally for Uganda.

Youth career 
Bayo was the top scorer in the Uganda National Secondary Schools competition Copa Coca Cola in 2014. He scored 11 goals for the champions, Kibuli SS.

Club career

Proline FC 
He joined Proline FC in 2014 at age 16. He played 25 games and scored 16 goals in the 2015–16 season of the second biggest league in Uganda, the Uganda Big League.

His performance contributed to the promotion of Proline FC to the Uganda Premier League.

In the 2016–17 season, he scored six goals for Proline. He played 18 games.

Bayo played half of the 2017-18 Uganda Premier League season. He scored six goals in 14 league games. He joined the Zambian club Buildcon F.C. during the season break.

Buildcom FC 
At age 18, Bayo joined the Zambian club Buildcon F.C. in January 2018. He has scored nine goals and made six assists in 16 games.

F.C. Ashdod 
On 27 July 2020 signed in the Israeli Premier League club F.C. Ashdod.

International career 
Bayo received a call-up to the Uganda National Senior team from coach Sebastien Desabre in March 2018 during the international break. Bayo played in both friendlies against Sao Tome and Malawi.

International goals
Scores and results list Uganda's goal tally first.

References

External links

1998 births
Living people
Ugandan footballers
People from Buikwe District
Uganda international footballers
Proline FC players
Buildcon F.C. players
Vipers SC players
F.C. Ashdod players
Bnei Sakhnin F.C. players
MFK Vyškov players
Uganda Premier League players
Israeli Premier League players
Czech National Football League players
Ugandan expatriate footballers
Association football forwards
Expatriate footballers in Zambia
Expatriate footballers in Israel
Expatriate footballers in the Czech Republic
Ugandan expatriate sportspeople in Zambia
Ugandan expatriate sportspeople in Israel
Ugandan expatriate sportspeople in the Czech Republic